Johnthan Shuntay Banks (born October 3, 1989) is a former American football cornerback. He played college football at Mississippi State, where he received All-America honors. He was drafted by the Tampa Bay Buccaneers in the second round of the 2013 NFL Draft.

Early years
Banks was born in Maben, Mississippi. He attended East Webster High School in Cumberland, where he played safety  and quarterback for the East Webster Wolverines high school football team.

Considered a three-star recruit by 247Sports.com, Banks was listed as the No. 41 safety in the nation in 2009.

College career
Banks enrolled in Mississippi State University, where he played for the Mississippi State Bulldogs football team from 2009 to 2012.  He compiled 221 tackles, a school record, 16 interceptions, four quarterback sacks and four touchdowns.  He was originally a safety, but made the switch to cornerback as a sophomore.  Following his senior season in 2012, he won the Jim Thorpe Award for the top defensive back in college football.  He also received first-team All-American honors from the Football Writers Association of America, the Walter Camp Football Foundation, and Scout.com, and was a first-team All-Southeastern Conference (SEC) selection.

Professional career
Prior to the 2013 NFL Draft, Banks was considered one of the best cornerback prospects but after the disappointing NFL combine, most NFL scouts put him as a late first-round or an early second-round pick.

Tampa Bay Buccaneers
On April 26, 2013, Banks was drafted by the Tampa Bay Buccaneers in the second round (43rd overall) in the 2013 NFL Draft. He was the sixth cornerback taken in the 2013 NFL draft behind Dee Milliner, D. J. Hayden, Desmond Trufant, Xavier Rhodes, and fellow college teammate Darius Slay, respectively. On May 23, 2013, Banks signed his four-year contract with the Tampa Bay Buccaneers, worth $4.726 million, including a $1.817 million bonus.  Banks got his first interception against Carson Palmer and the Arizona Cardinals on September 29, 2013. During the season, he contracted methicillin-resistant Staphylococcus aureus (MSRA). Despite the infection, he finished his rookie season with 55 tackles and 3 interceptions.

After training camp and the preseason, Banks was named the starting cornerback opposite Alterraun Verner. The Tampa 2 system installed by head coach Lovie Smith proved to play to Banks' strengths as he notched 50 tackles, 10 passes defensed, and four interceptions for the 2014 season.

Detroit Lions
Banks was traded to the Detroit Lions for a seventh round pick on November 1, 2016. He was released by the Lions on December 3, 2016.

Chicago Bears
On December 5, 2016, Banks was signed by the Bears.

On March 11, 2017, Banks signed a one-year contract with the Bears. He was released on September 2, 2017.

Houston Texans
On September 20, 2017, Banks signed with the Houston Texans. He was released on October 10, 2017.

References

External links
 
 Mississippi State Bulldogs bio
 Tampa Bay Buccaneers bio

1989 births
Living people
American football cornerbacks
Mississippi State Bulldogs football players
Tampa Bay Buccaneers players
Players of American football from Mississippi
Detroit Lions players
Chicago Bears players
Houston Texans players
People from Maben, Mississippi